Salah Ezzedine (born in 1962 in South Lebanon) is a Lebanese businessman who is accused of running a pyramid scheme. He had supposed investments in oil, publishing, metals and television, and his businesses spread out from the Gulf to Africa. He was well known as a philanthropist.

Before the fraud scandal occurred, he was known for his generosity and had even built a stadium and a mosque for his hometown of Maaroub. 

In the ensuing debacle, financial downfall and declaring of his bankruptcy, Lebanese investors, mostly from the Shia community lost hundreds of million dollars. Amounts involved vary between $700 million to 1.2 billion dollars was lost by Lebanese investors .

References

1962 births
Living people
Lebanese Shia Muslims
Lebanese businesspeople